The SNCAC NC.3021 Belphégor was a French high altitude research aircraft designed and built at the end of World War II.  Only one was completed and it was not a success, in part because of problems with its unusual engine.

Design and development
The Belphégor had its origins during World War II in Marcel Roca's SNCAC NC.3020 design, an ultimately unbuilt aircraft powered by a coupled pair of Hispano-Suiza HS.12Z engines mounted side by side in the nose driving coaxial propellers. When work on the design resumed at the war's end these engines were replaced with a similarly arranged Daimler-Benz pair, resulting in a revised type, the NC.3021. The Belphégor was intended to provide a high altitude laboratory for studies of the meteorology of the upper atmosphere, high altitude aerodynamics and also of incoming cosmic rays. The pressurization system was fed from a large scoop intake below the engine into engine driven compressors. They had observation windows in the cabin roof and in its floor. The crew positions were also in the pressurized region: the pilot's cockpit placed his head above the upper fuselage under a clear canopy. Two other crew, navigator and radio operator sat wholly within the cabin.

The Belphégor was a cantilever mid-wing monoplane.  The three part, high aspect ratio wing was strongly tapered in plan, mid-positioned and built around a single steel main spar with two auxiliary spars which were wooden in the outer sections.  The broad chord wing roots  were carefully faired into a near circular fuselage. The ailerons, fitted with tabs, were metal framed but fabric covered. Two part, hydraulically operated camber changing metal slotted flaps were fitted. Its semi-monocoque fuselage was in three sections; the metal forward part contained the German-designed  Daimler-Benz DB 610A twin-crankcased "power system" engine unit weighing some 1.5 tonnes by itself, with its circular radiator in the nose and driving a single four blade propeller as well as the pressurization system. Behind it a tubular Dural structure supported the double skinned cabin and a final, wooden tail section.  The tail unit was conventional, with a single tall straight edged, round topped fin and rudder. All the flight controls, whether on the wings or the tail, were both dynamically and aerodynamically balanced. The tail wheel undercarriage had inward retracting main legs.

Its first flight was on 6 June 1946 from Toussus-le-Noble Airport. Flight tests were made difficult, if not dangerous, by the DB 610's tendency to overheat and they were abandoned either in 1947 in the absence of financial support or in 1949, after only forty flying hours, because of the continuing mechanical problems.

Specifications

References

1940s French experimental aircraft
0300
Mid-wing aircraft
Single-engined tractor aircraft
Aircraft first flown in 1946